'St. William's Catholic Church may refer to  
 St. William's Catholic Church (Long Lake, New York), list on the National Register of Historic Places listings in Hamilton County, New York
 St. William's Catholic Church (Ramona, South Dakota), list on the National Register of Historic Places listings in Lake County, South Dakota